Leucanopsis quanta is a moth of the family Erebidae. It was described by William Schaus in 1896. It is found in Brazil and Bolivia.

References

quanta
Moths described in 1896